Debatable typically refers to something able to be debated. It is also sometimes used as a synonym for moot.

It may also refer to:

 Debatable, a television quiz show on the BBC